Megachile opacifrons is a species of bee in the family Megachilidae. It was described by Pérez in 1897.

References

Opacifrons
Insects described in 1897